The Camanti District is one of the twelve districts in the Quispicanchi Province in Peru. Created by Law No. 11624 on January 2, 1857, its capital is the town of Quince Mil.

Geography 
Some of the highest peaks of the district are listed below:

See also 
 Q'umirqucha

References 

  Instituto Nacional de Estadística e Informática. Departamento Cusco. Retrieved on November 1, 2007.

1857 establishments in Peru